Mark Tooley (born 29 April 1956) is an Australian cricketer. He played in one first-class and two List A matches for Queensland between 1989 and 1993.

See also
 List of Queensland first-class cricketers

References

External links
 

1956 births
Living people
Australian cricketers
Queensland cricketers
Cricketers from Queensland